Michael Netolitzky (born 12 January 1994) is a former German footballer who last played as a goalkeeper for Bayern Munich II. He currently works as a goalkeeping coach along with Walter Junghans for Bayern Munich II, although he is retired as a footballer and have not officially played since 2020, Netolitzky has been called up for the team as a backup goalkeeper when only one is available.

Career
Netolitzky started his career at FSV Bayreuth, then he played for 1. FC Nürnberg, 1860 Munich and Hallescher FC, before joining Bayern Munich II, where he ended his career due to injury.

Afterwards, he became a goalkeeper coach at Bayern Munich women's team.

References

External links
 Profile at FuPa.net

1994 births
Living people
Sportspeople from Bayreuth
Footballers from Bavaria
German footballers
Association football goalkeepers
TSV 1860 Munich II players
Hallescher FC players
FC Bayern Munich II players
3. Liga players
Regionalliga players